The 2009 Manx Grand Prix was held between Saturday 22 August and Friday 4 September 2009 on the 37.733-mile Mountain Course.

The Blue Riband event of race week was won by Michael Russell claiming victory in the Senior.  The Ultra-Lightweight race proved to be an historic event with Carolynn Sells becoming the first female solo winner on the Snaefell Mountain Course.  A hat-trick of successive race wins was completed by Ryan Farquhar winning the Senior Classic race.  The Junior Manx Grand Prix was won by Stephen McIlvenna and Sean Murphy the Newcomers Race with Adrian Kershaw winning Class B. The combined Junior Classic Race was won by Chris McGahan and Ewan Hamilton winning the 250 cc Class. There was further race win for Ryan Farquhar in the new Post Classic Race Class with Brian Mateer first in Class (ii). There was a second successive win for Dan Sayle in the Lightweight Manx Grand Prix and second race win on the Mountain Course in 2009 after winning Sidecar TT Race 'A'. Musician Jake Drake-Brockman, a former member with the Liverpool group Echo & the Bunnymen, was involved in a fatal road traffic accident near Orrisdale North when the vintage BSA motorcycle he was riding was in collision with a converted ambulance.

Results

Practice Times

2009 Senior Manx Grand Prix Practice Times and Leaderboard
 Plates; Black race digits on Yellow race plates.

2009 Junior Manx Grand Prix Practice Times and Leaderboard
 Plates; Black race digits on Blue race plates.

2009 Senior Classic Practice Times and Leaderboard
 Plates; White digits on Black race plates.
 Classic Machines 351 cc-500 cc

2009 Junior Classic Practice Times and Leaderboard
 Plates; Black digits on White race plates.
 Class A Classic Machines 300 cc-350 cc

2009 Newcomers Race 'A' Practice Times and Leaderboard
 Plates; White digits on Red race plates
 Class A
 550 cc-750 cc Four-stroke Four-cylinder motorcycles.
 651 cc-1000 cc Four-stroke Twin-cylinder motorcycles.
 601 cc-675 cc Four-stroke Three-cylinder motorcycles.

2009 Newcomers Race 'B' Practice Times and Leaderboard
 Plates; White digits on Red race plates.
 Class B .
 125 cc-Two-stroke Single-cylinder motorcycles.
 251 cc-400 cc Four-stroke Four-cylinder motorcycles.
 Up to 650 cc Four-stroke Twin-cylinder motorcycles.

Race Results

Race 1a; Newcomers Race A
Tuesday  1 September 2009 – Mountain Course  3 laps – 113.00 miles (181.96 km).
 550 cc-750 cc Four-stroke Four-cylinder motorcycles.
 651 cc-1000 cc Four-stroke Twin-cylinder motorcycles.
 601 cc-675 cc Four-stroke Three-cylinder motorcycles.

Fastest Lap: Sean Murphy – 113.840 mph (19' 53.15) on lap 1.

Race 1a; Newcomers Race B
Tuesday  1 September 2009 – Mountain Course  3 laps – 113.00 miles (181.96 km).
 125 cc-Two-stroke Single-cylinder motorcycles.
 251 cc-400 cc Four-stroke Four-cylinder motorcycles.
 Up to 650 cc Four-stroke Twin-cylinder motorcycles.

Fastest Lap: Adrian Kershaw – 101.027 mph (22' 24.47) on lap 1.

Race 1b; Post Classic Race Class (i)
Tuesday  1 September 2009 – Mountain Course  3 laps – 113.00 miles (181.96 km).
 550 cc-1000 cc Four-stroke Four-cylinder motorcycles with 2 valves.

Fastest Lap: Ryan Farquhar – 108.045 mph (20' 57.14) on lap 1.

Race 1b; Post Classic Race Class (ii)
Tuesday  1 September 2009 – Mountain Course  3 laps – 113.00 miles (181.96 km).
 126 cc-250 cc Two-stroke Cylinder motorcycles with 2 valves.
 251 cc-350 cc Two-stroke Cylinder motorcycles with 2 valves.
 351 cc-500 cc Two-stroke Cylinder motorcycles with 2 valves.

Fastest Lap: Brian Muir – 103.130 mph (21' 57.06) on lap 1.

Race 2; Junior Manx Grand Prix
Wednesday 2 September 2009 – Mountain Course 4 laps – 150.92 miles (242.80 km)
 201 cc-250 cc Two-stroke motorcycles.
 550 cc-600 cc Four-stroke four-cylinder motorcycles.
 651 cc-750 cc Four-stroke twin-cylinder motorcycles .

Fastest Lap; Ryan Kneen – 19 minutes 03.93 seconds  118.738 mph on lap 1

Race 3a; Senior Classic Race
Wednesday 2 September 2009 – Mountain Course 4 laps – 150.92 miles (242.80 km)
 For motorcycles exceeding 351 cc and not exceeding 500 cc

Fastest Lap: Ryan Farquhar – 110.984 mph (20' 23.85) on lap 3

Race 3b; Junior Classic Race
Wednesday 2 September 2009 – Mountain Course 4 laps – 150.92 miles (242.80 km)
 Class A for motorcycles exceeding 300 cc and not exceeding 350 cc.

Fastest Lap: Alan Oversby – 100.383 mph (22' 33.10) on lap 2

Race 4a; Lightweight Manx Grand Prix
Friday 4 September 2009 – Mountain Course 4 laps – 150.92 miles (242.80 km)
 Two-stroke motorcycles 201 cc – 350 cc

Neil Kent – 19 minutes 50.35 seconds  114.108 mph

Race 4b; Ultra-Lightweight Manx Grand Prix
Friday 4 September 2009 – Mountain Course 4 laps – 150.92 miles (242.80 km)
 Two-stroke motorcycles up to 125 cc, 6 gears maximum.
 Four-stroke motorcycles 251 cc – 401 cc
 Up to 650 cc Four-stroke twin-cylinder.

Fastest Lap Wayne Kirwan – 20 minutes 55.04 seconds  108.226 mph.

Race 5; Senior Manx Grand Prix
Friday 4 September 2009 – Mountain Course  Mountain Course 4 laps – 150.92 miles (242.80 km)
 Four-stroke Four-cylinder motorcycles exceeding 550 cc and not exceeding 750 cc.
 Four-stroke Twin-cylinder motorcycles exceeding 651 cc and not exceeding 1000 cc.
 Four-stroke Three-cylinder motorcycles exceeding 601 cc and not exceeding 675 cc.

Fastest Lap: Michael Russell – 116.110 mph (19' 29.82) on lap 2.

Sources

External links
 Detailed race results
 Mountain Course map

2009
Manx
Manx
Manx